Maren Baumbach (born 14 January 1981 in Stuttgart) is a German handball player. She played for the club FCK Handball.

She won a bronze medal at the 2007 World Women's Handball Championship.

She competed with the German national team at the 2008 Summer Olympics in China, where Germany was placed 11th.

References

1981 births
Living people
German female handball players
Handball players at the 2008 Summer Olympics
Olympic handball players of Germany
Sportspeople from Stuttgart